Józef Potocki (died 1723) was a Polish szlachcic. He became a Crown Great Guard (Polish: Strażnik Wielki Koronny) in 1720, and was also the starost of Bełz

References

17th-century births
1723 deaths
Jozef Potocki 16xx